Ilvo Hokkanen (born May 3, 1985) is a Finnish former ice hockey centre.

Hokkanen played in the SM-liiga for HPK, Tappara and HIFK. He also played in Germany's DEL2 for EHC Freiburg and in France's FFHG Division 1 for Anglet Hormadi Élite and Ligue Magnus for Pionniers de Chamonix-Morzine.

Hokkanen played in the 2005 World Junior Ice Hockey Championships for Finland.

Career statistics

References

External links

1985 births
Living people
Anglet Hormadi Élite players
Finnish ice hockey players
EHC Freiburg players
HIFK (ice hockey) players
HPK players
KooKoo players
Mikkelin Jukurit players
People from Hämeenlinna
HC Salamat players
Tappara players
TuTo players
Sportspeople from Kanta-Häme